Fragaria emeiensis is a species of strawberry native to the Emei Mountains within Sichuan Province in south-western China. This species was discovered during the construction of a pan-genome for the strawberry.

Description 
All strawberries have a base haploid count of 7 chromosomes. Fragaria daltoniana is diploid, having 2 pairs of these chromosomes for a total of 14 chromosomes. It is uniquely robust with thicker pinnately quinquefoliolate leaves.

References 

Fragaria
Plants described in 2021